Jimmy Macbride (born May 10, 1991) is an American jazz drummer and composer. He is the older brother of jazz pianist, composer and film maker Alma Macbride.

Biography 

Raised in West Hartford, Connecticut, Macbride grew up in an artistic family—his father a composer of classical music and his mother a visual artist. He developed an early interest in jazz from listening to his parents' cassettes of Frank Sinatra and began to perform professionally while in the third grade.  He later attended Hall High School where he participated in the school's award-winning jazz program and has since been cited among its notable alumni (including pianist Brad Mehldau, saxophonists Joel Frahm and Noah Preminger, and composer Patrick Zimmerli). In 2009, he relocated to New York City to study at the Juilliard School.

He has worked with saxophonists Jimmy Greene, Chad Lefkowitz-Brown, Chase Baird, and Lucas Pino, guitarists Nir Felder and Adam Rogers, pianist David Virelles and others. He has also been a key member of Samora Pinderhughes' Transformation Suite ensemble.

Together with his sister Alma Macbride, Jimmy has given concerts throughout the greater Hartford, Connecticut area at senior citizen homes and other similar venues.  The duo donated all proceeds to the Whiting Lane School to aid in the purchase of musical instruments and other equipment.

Discography

As sideman

References

External links 

1991 births
Living people
American jazz drummers
American jazz composers
Juilliard School alumni
21st-century American drummers
Hall High School (Connecticut) alumni